The Annie Award for Voice Acting in an Animated Television/Broadcasting Production is an Annie Award given annually to the best voice acting in an animated television or broadcasting production. The category was gone through some name changes and divisions: 
 From 1994 to 1996, the Best Achievement in Voice Acting award was presented to recognize voice acting for both film and television productions. 
 In 1997, two categories were created for voice acting in television productions divided by the gender of the performer, resulting in Outstanding Individual Achievement for Voice Acting by a Female Performer in an Animated Television Production and Outstanding Individual Achievement for Voice Acting by a Male Performer in an Animated Television Production, these categories were presented until 2001, with the exception of 1999 where a genre-neutral category was presented.

Since 2002, the gender-neutral category Outstanding Achievement for Voice Acting in a Television Production is presented, later being renamed to also include broadcasting productions alongside television ones.

Winners and nominees

1990s
Best Achievement in Voice Acting

 Outstanding Individual Achievement for Voice Acting in an Animated Feature Production

2000s

 Outstanding Achievement for Voice Acting in a Television Production

2010s

2020s

Multiple wins 
3 wins
Tom Kenny
 Rob Paulsen

2 wins
 June Foray
 Eartha Kitt
 Maurice LaMarche
 Kristen Schaal

See also
 Primetime Emmy Award for Outstanding Voice-Over Performance

References

External links 
 Annie Awards: Legacy

Annie Awards
Voice acting awards